Fleet admiral (abbreviated FADM) is a five-star flag officer rank in the United States Navy whose rewards uniquely include active duty pay for life. Fleet admiral ranks immediately above admiral and is equivalent to General of the Army and General of the Air Force. 

Although it is a current and authorized rank, no U.S. Navy officer holds it presently. Only four men have ever held the rank: William D. Leahy, Ernest King, Chester W. Nimitz, and William Halsey Jr. Leahy, King, and Nimitz were promoted to the rank in December 1944, followed by Halsey in December 1945. While all four men effectively retired in the late 1940s, the rank of fleet admiral is for life. The last active fleet admiral was Nimitz, who died in 1966.

History

Post Spanish–American War

The Navy originally had an established precursor 5-star rank of Admiral of the Navy, that was superior to Admiral. 
The rank used the 1867 regulation Admiral insignia. This rank was established and given only to Admiral George Dewey, in recognition of his victory at Manila Bay in 1898. On March 2, 1899, Congress passed  approving the creation of the rank. The Senate confirmed Dewey's promotion to that rank on March 14, 1903, and he was officially promoted to Admiral of the Navy on March 24, 1903, with a retroactive date-of-rank of March 2, 1899. The congressional act also stipulated that upon Dewey's death, the rank would cease to exist. Dewey died on January 16, 1917, ending the Navy's use of the rank.

World War II
A proper five-star rank of fleet admiral was created in 1944 in order to give United States military officers comparable rank to five-star officers of allied nations. The rank of fleet admiral was created by an Act of Congress for four officers to hold on a temporary basis under Pub.L. 78-482 on December 14, 1944. Although Congress authorized the promotion of Omar Bradley to the five-star rank of General of the Army in 1950 while serving as Chairman of the Joint Chiefs of Staff so that he would be of the same rank as General of the Army Douglas MacArthur, the theater commander in Korea, there has been no new legislation authorizing the use of the rank of fleet admiral since 1946.

It was held during and after World War II by the following officers:

The timing of the first three appointments was carefully planned, such that a clear order of seniority and a near-equivalence between the services was established for the Generals of the Army promoted at the same time. General Marshall was promoted to General of the Army on December 16, 1944; General MacArthur was promoted on December 18, 1944; General Eisenhower was promoted on December 20, 1944, and General Arnold was promoted on December 21, 1944. He would later be laterally promoted to General of the Air Force on May 7, 1949, after the Air Force was created as a separate service as part of the National Defense Act of 1947.

The insignia for a fleet admiral is composed of five silver stars in a pentagonal design. Worn on the service dress blue uniform sleeve was a gold stripe two inches wide surrounding the sleeve two inches from the cuff with four half-inch stripes placed at  inch intervals. The single gold five-pointed star, one ray down, worn above the top stripe was not part of the rank, but indicated the wearer to be a line officer.

Post–World War II
Another contender to receive the rank of fleet admiral was Admiral Raymond A. Spruance; the choice between him and Halsey was an issue that occupied several months of deliberation, before Admiral King finally chose Halsey. Purportedly U.S. Representative Carl Vinson, chairman of  the House Armed Services committee and a strong supporter of Halsey, was responsible for blocking subsequent efforts to promote Spruance to fleet admiral (although his promotion continued to be blocked after Vinson retired). Instead, Spruance's achievements were recognized by the unique honor of a Special Act of Congress awarding him full four-star admiral's salary during the remainder of his life. Spruance expressed the following feelings over the issue:

The first fleet admiral to leave active duty was Ernest King who retired immediately after the conclusion of World War II.  Chester Nimitz and William Halsey both retired two years later while William Leahy was the last fleet admiral to leave active duty in 1949.  According to Public Law 78-482, fleet admirals on active duty receive the same pay as a Rear Admiral, Upper Half (two star) plus a $5,000 personal allowance, and upon retirement were to receive 75% of their active duty pay. When Public Law 79-333 made the rank permanent for Leahy, King, Nimitz, and Halsey, it also provided for full pay and allowances once those officers retired. As with a general of the army, a fleet admiral was entitled to an office maintained by the Navy along with an aide (of the rank of Captain), a secretary, and an orderly.

Three of the four fleet admirals died in the late 1950s and, by 1960, Chester Nimitz was the sole surviving U.S. Navy fleet admiral.  He held a ceremonial post as Navy adviser to the Western Sea Frontier with his quarters based in San Francisco.  Nimitz died in 1966 with no further fleet admirals appointed since.

Modern usage
No officers have been appointed to the rank of fleet admiral since William Halsey. The rank of fleet admiral is still maintained as a rank of the U.S. Navy, and could again be bestowed, pending approval of the United States Senate. However, the President, with consent from the Senate, may award a fifth star at any time they see fit.

In the 1990s, there were proposals in Department of Defense academic circles to bestow a five-star rank on the office of the Chairman of the Joint Chiefs of Staff.

As recently as the late 2000s, some commentators proposed that the military leader in the Global War on Terrorism be promoted to a five-star rank.

Ranks senior to fleet admiral
The Navy does not have an established rank senior to fleet admiral. The only officially recognized United States military rank senior to fleet admiral is General of the Armies when Congress passed  in 1976, promoting George Washington to that rank and making him senior to all other grades of the Army, past or present.

See also
 United States Navy officer rank insignia
 List of U.S. military leaders by rank
 List of fleet and grand admirals
 List of comparative military ranks
 Admiral of the fleet as used in other countries
 Supreme Allied Commander

References

Military ranks of the United States Navy
Five-star officers